Alex Andreev (born 1972 in Chudovo) is a Russian artist working in digital painting, using virtual and augmented reality in his artworks.

Biography 
Alex Andreev was born in Chudovo, Novgorod region in 1972. In 1994 he graduated from the Novgorod State University, Faculty of Architecture and Design. Since 1989 he has been creating artworks in traditional graphic technics, using pen ink and a pencil In 2008 he turned to digital painting. Using Adobe Photoshop, he has been creating personal artworks as well as movie concept arts.
In 2016 he provided concept arts for "The Roadside Picnic", at the same time creating artworks including augmented and virtual reality. Since 2018 he has been creating 3D digital artworks in the space of virtual reality by virtual sculpturing through the Oculus Medium. Now he is an art director of Spheroid Universe project, who is supervising the augmented reality installations made by ther artists His artworks are shown in the State Museum of Urban Sculpture as well as in the UGallery, USA.

Creation

Painting 
Alex Andreev is considered as a surrealist.
He works in the technique of digital painting and creates artworks in virtual and augmented reality.
His illustrations represent the image of the near future intertwined with modern reality. He devoted a series of pictures to the St Petersburg where he is living at the moment.

Cinema 
 Full-length animated film, directed by George Danelia: backgrounds art director and senior concept artist
 "Zone" TV series based on the story of A. and B. Strugatsky " The Roadside Picnic" (production designer)
 2014 Twisted Dagger, an unreleased television series based on works by Lovecraft (concept artist)
 2016 "The Roadside Picnic", a television series-screen version of the Strugatsky brothers' " The Roadside Picnic", Sony Pictures, directed by Alan Taylor (concept artist)

publications 
The author of the book covers of the complete works of Arkady and Boris Strugatsky

A Separate Reality Artbook

Publications in the magazines Magic-CG, Advanced Creation Photoshop

Augmented reality 
Andreev's artworks can be "brought to life" by the special app: point the camera of your smartphone on the picture to make the sound and the video appear.

Gallery

Exhibitions 

 1993, Personal Exhibition, Novgorod State University, Veliky Novgorod 
 1993, ‘Black And White Dreams’ personal exhibition,  Novgorod State University, Veliky Novgorod 
 2002, ‘Artist’s Head: Sectional View’ personal exhibition,  Valencia Gallery, St. Petersburg 
 2014 Personal Exhibition, Center of Contemporary Arts, Veliky Novgorod, Russia 
 2014 "A Separate Reality', Personal Exhibition, Art gallery, Chudovo, Russia 
 2014 "A Separate Reality', Personal Exhibition, Kino Iluzion, Warsaw, Poland 
 2015 "Generator Of The Universes", Creative claster "Artmuza" (with Igor Ivanov), St. Petersburg, Russia 
 2015 "A Separate Reality', Personal Exhibition, Ausländerrat Dresden e.V., Drezden, Germany 
 2015 "Metronomicon", Erarta Contemporary Art Center, St. Petersburg, Russia 
 2015 Positive Hack Days 
 2015, Moscow, Russia 
 2015 "A Separate Reality', Personal Exhibition,  Sevastopol, Russia 
 2016 Positive Hack Days 
 2016, Moscow, Russia 
 2017 Positive Hack Days 
 2017, Moscow, Russia 
 2017 AAD 2017, Kaohsiung, Taiwan 
 2017 "A Separate Reality', Personal Exhibition,  Niebo Kopernika, Warsaw, Poland 
 2017 Games of Mind, St. Petersburg, Russia 
 2017 London Moll, St. Petersburg, Russia 
 2017 HR- tech conference, Nizhny Novgorod, Russia 
 2018 Erarta Contemporary Art Center, St. Petersburg, Russia 
 2018 AAD 2018, Kaohsiung, Taiwan

References

External links 

 http://alexandreev.com - site
 Digital Painting with Augmented Reality 

YouTubeidyEDXtLpQ9LE

1972 births
Russian contemporary artists
Russian painters
Living people